The Bath Bathers were a minor league baseball team based in Bath, New York, In 1890, the Bathers played as members of the short–lived four–team Independent level Western New York League.

History
Minor league baseball began in Bath, New York in 1890. The Bath "Bathers" became charter members of the Independent level Western New York League, which formed late in the 1890 season. The teams from Canisteo, New York, Hornell and Wellsville, New York joined Bath as the four league charter franchises, beginning league play on September 9, 1890.

The Bath Bathers finished in last place in the short season of play. When the season ended on September 27, 1890, the Canisteo team was in 1st place with a 6–0 record. Canisteo was followed by Wellsville (3–3), Hornell (2–4) and the Bath Bathers (1–5) in the final standings. The Bath manager is not referenced.

The Western New York League permanently folded after the 1890 season.

Bath, New York has not hosted another minor league team.

The ballpark
The name of the home minor league ballpark of the 1890 Bath Bathers is not known.

Year–by–year record

Notable alumni
The 1890 Bath Bathers' minor league roster is not referenced.

References

External links
Stats Crew

Defunct minor league baseball teams
Defunct baseball teams in New York (state)
Baseball teams established in 1890
Baseball teams disestablished in 1890
Steuben County, New York